Jeremy Dunn Jackson (born October 16, 1980) is an American actor and singer. He is best known for his role as Hobie Buchannon on the television show Baywatch.

Career

Television

Jackson appeared in 159 episodes of the TV series Baywatch, more than any other actor apart from David Hasselhoff, playing Hobie Buchannon from season 2 through season 10 (1991–1999).

Music career
Jackson was introduced to music by David Hasselhoff, who starred on Baywatch, on which Jackson appeared. Jackson later supported Hasselhoff on his 1993 European tour and Jackson was signed to Edel Records by Peter Lopez. An Australian musician, Mark Holden, who was working with Hasselhoff, wrote a number of songs and produced the album.

Albums
 Number One (1994) NL No. 17, DE No. 90
 Always (1995)

Singles
 "I Need You" (1994)
 "Looking for My Number 1" (1994)
 "You Can Run" (1995)
 "French Kiss" (1995)
 "I'm Gonna Miss You" (1995)
 "You Really Got It Going On" (1997)

Other
Jackson was featured in Vanity Fair's Hollywood Issue in March 2006. He has been referred to as "Mr. MySpace" and was a guest on The Tyra Banks Show. Jackson has performed in clubs from London to Las Vegas. Jackson endorsed Ed Hardy Clothing, and has hosted fashion shows around the world for the fashion house.

He appeared on VH1's Confessions of a Teen Idol, a reality show in which former teen idols attempt to revitalize their careers.  In one episode, he claimed he beat out Leonardo DiCaprio for the part of Hobie Buchannon; this was later verified by David Hasselhoff. The show is co-produced by Scott Baio and Jason Hervey.

In 2012, Jeremy worked with PhilaDreams Films on the unreleased independent movie, Dreams, which was filmed by Thomas J. Walton and Vaughn Goland.

In January 2015, Jackson participated in the United Kingdom reality television series Celebrity Big Brother 15, where he placed 15th, on Channel 5. After four days, producers removed him from the house for opening fellow housemate Chloe Goodman's dressing gown against her will. Jackson was later cautioned by the Hertfordshire Police following their investigation into common assault.

Personal life

In 2008, a sex tape of Jackson and adult video star Sky Lopez was offered for sale. Jackson asserted that he was physically threatened into giving the tape to men who claimed they represented Lopez.

In an interview on the E! TV special Child Star Confidential Jackson stated that problems with drugs contributed to his departure from Baywatch, but that he had overcome his addiction following rehabilitation. In 2011, Jackson was a fifth-season cast member on Celebrity Rehab with Dr. Drew, which depicted his recovery from steroid addiction.

In 2017, as part of a plea bargain, Jackson was sentenced to 270 days in jail for a 2015 stabbing.

Filmography
 Santa Barbara (1984) TV Series Young Derek Griffin (1990)
 Shout (1991) (V) Young BellRinger
 Baywatch (TV) Hobie Buchannon No. 2 (1991–1999)
 The Bulkin Trail (1992) (TV) Young Michael Bulkin
 Thunder Alley (1994) (TV) Danny
 Baywatch: White Thunder at Glacier Bay (1998) (V) Hobie Buchannon
 The E! True Hollywood Story: Baywatch (2001) (TV) Himself
 Baywatch: Hawaiian Wedding (2003) (TV) Hobie Buchannon
 Ring of Darkness (2004) (V) Xavier
 Expose (2005) (V) Jake Stevens
 Child Star Confidential Teen Idol – E! Entertainment TV (2006) (TV) Himself
 The Tyra Banks Show (2006) (TV) Himself
 The Big Idea with Donny Deutsch CNBC (2006) (TV) Himself
 The View ABC (2006) (TV) Himself
 The Loop g4tv (2006) (TV) Himself
 The E! True Hollywood Story: David Hasselhoff (2006) (TV) Himself
 The Rachael Ray Show (2009) (TV) Himself
 The Tyra Banks Show (2009) (TV) Himself
 Confessions of a Teen Idol (2009) (TV) Himself
 The Untitled Kris Black Project (2010) (V) Caleb
 Celebrity Rehab with Dr. Drew (2011) Himself
 DTLA (2012) Kevin
 Dreams (2013) DJ Smoove 
 Celebrity Big Brother UK (2015) (TV) Himself

References

External links
Jeremy Jackson Online

Official MySpace Page

1980 births
Living people
American male child actors
20th-century American male actors
People from Newport Beach, California
American male television actors
Musicians from California